Ishøj Municipality (Danish: Ishøj Kommune) is a municipality (Danish: kommune) in Region Hovedstaden on the island of Zealand (Sjælland) in eastern Denmark.  The municipality covers 26 km², with a total population of 23,225 (1. January 2022).  Its mayor is Merete Amdisen, a member of the Social Democrats (Socialdemokraterne) political party.

As of 2023, it has the highest share of people with a foreign-background in Denmark, with 44.2% having a foreign-background. 55.8% has a Danish-background, 16.3% Turkish, 5.6% Pakistani and 22.3% have another background (Polish, Nepali, Iraqi, Romanian, Indian, Moroccan and Bulgarian, among others).

The main town, and the site of the municipal council, is the town of Ishøj, which has one of Scandinavia's biggest housing projects - Vejleåparken (formerly Ishøjplanen). Other places are the villages of Ishøj Landsby and Torslunde.

Neighboring municipalities are Vallensbæk to the east, Høje-Taastrup to the north and west, and Greve to the south.

Ishøj Municipality was not merged with other municipalities on 1 January 2007 as part of nationwide Kommunalreformen ("The Municipal Reform" of 2007).

Politics

Municipal council
Ishøj's municipal council consists of 19 members, elected every four years.

Below are the municipal councils elected since the Municipal Reform of 2007.

Notable people 
 Gudrun Stig Aagaard (1895 in the village of Torslunde – 1986) a Danish textile artist who specialized in printed fabrics

See also
 Ishøj station
 Køge Bugt Strandpark
 Arken Museum of Modern Art

References 

 Municipal statistics: NetBorger Kommunefakta, delivered from KMD aka Kommunedata (Municipal Data)
 Municipal merges and neighbors: Eniro new municipalities map

External links

Municipality's official website

 
Municipalities in the Capital Region of Denmark
Municipalities of Denmark
Copenhagen metropolitan area